The Bishop of Lincoln is the ordinary (diocesan bishop) of the Church of England Diocese of Lincoln in the Province of Canterbury.

The present diocese covers the county of Lincolnshire and the unitary authority areas of North Lincolnshire and North East Lincolnshire. The bishop's seat (cathedra) is located in the Cathedral Church of the Blessed Virgin Mary in the city of Lincoln. The cathedral was originally a minster church founded around 653 and refounded as a cathedral in 1072. Until the 1530s the bishops were in full communion with the Roman Catholic Church.

The historic medieval Bishop's Palace lies immediately to the south of the cathedral in Palace Yard; managed by English Heritage, it is open to visitors. A later residence (first used by Bishop Edward King in 1885) on the same site was converted from office accommodation to reopen in 2009 as a 16-bedroom conference centre and wedding venue. It is now known as Edward King House and provides offices for the bishops, archdeacons and diocesan staff. A 14-bedroom house (Bishop's House) on Eastgate was the official residence in use from 1948 until 2011, when the bishop's office staff and home were separated, allowing the incoming bishop, Christopher Lowson, to live in a modern five-bedroom house.
 A further residence of the mediaeval Bishops of Lincoln was Banbury Castle, built in 1135 by Alexander of Lincoln, Bishop of Lincoln and retained by the see until 1547.

History

The Anglo-Saxon dioceses of Lindsey and Leicester were established when the large Diocese of Mercia was divided in the late 7th century into the bishoprics of Lichfield and Leicester (for Mercia itself), Worcester (for the Hwicce), Hereford (for the Magonsæte) and Lindsey (for the Lindisfaras).
The historic Bishop of Dorchester was a prelate who administered the Diocese of Dorchester in the Anglo-Saxon period. The bishop's seat, or cathedra, was at the cathedral in Dorchester-on-Thames in Oxfordshire.

In the 660s the seat at Dorchester-on-Thames was abandoned, but briefly in the late 670s it was once more a bishop's seat under Ætla, under Mercian control. The town of Dorchester again became the seat of a bishop in around 875, when the Mercian Bishop of Leicester transferred his seat there. The diocese merged with that of Lindsey in 971; the bishop's seat was moved to Lincoln in 1072 and thus the Mercian Bishops of Dorchester were succeeded by the Bishops of Lincoln.

The first bishops of Leicester were originally prelates who administered an Anglo-Saxon diocese between the 7th and 9th centuries. The bishopric fell victim to the invasion by the Danes and the episcopal see was transferred to Dorchester-on-Thames in Oxfordshire.

The dioceses of Lindsey and Leicester continued until the Danish Viking invasions and establishment of the Danelaw in the 9th century. The see of Leicester was transferred to Dorchester, now in Oxfordshire, sometime between 869 and 888. After an interruption, the see of Lindsey was resumed until it was united with the bishopric of Dorchester in the early 11th century. The diocese was the largest in England, extending from the River Thames to the Humber Estuary.

In 1072, Remigius de Fécamp moved the see of Dorchester to Lincoln, but the bishops of Lincoln retained significant landholdings within Oxfordshire. Because of this historic link, for a long time Banbury remained a "peculiar" of the Bishop of Lincoln.

Until the 1530s the bishops were in full communion with the Roman Catholic Church. During the English Reformation they changed their allegiance back and forth between the crown and the papacy. Under Henry VIII and Edward VI, the bishops conformed to the Church of England, but under Mary I they adhered to the Roman Catholic Church. Since the English Reformation, the bishops and diocese of Lincoln have been part of the reformed Church of England, and the Anglican Communion.

The dioceses of Oxford and Peterborough were created in 1541, out of parts of the Diocese of Lincoln. The county of Leicestershire was transferred from Lincoln to Peterborough in 1837.

List of bishops of Lincoln

Pre-Reformation bishops

Bishops during the Reformation

Post-Reformation bishops

Assistant bishops
Among those who have served as assistant bishops of the diocese have been:
19301934 (d.): John Hine, Archdeacon of Lincoln (until 1933) and former Bishop of Likoma, of Zanzibar, of Northern Rhodesia and of Grantham
19501964 (ret.): Colin Dunlop, Dean of Lincoln and former Bishop suffragan of Jarrow

Honorary assistant bishops, serving after their retirements, have included:
19681977 (d.): George Clarkson, retired Dean of Guildford and former Bishop suffragan-Archdeacon of Pontefract
19952016 (d.): Donald Snelgrove, retired Bishop of Hull
19952011 (d.): John Brown, retired Bishop in Cyprus and the Gulf
2001–present: David Tustin, retired Bishop of Grimsby

References

Sources
 

Lincoln
Bishops of Lincoln
Bishops of Lincoln
Diocese of Lincoln
Religion in Lincolnshire
 
History of Oxfordshire